Tarragona railway station is the central railway station of Tarragona, Spain. The station is situated on the Valencia−Sant Vicenç de Calders railway and is part of Adif and it accommodates RENFE conventional and Rodalies de Catalunya medium-distance trains.

Opened in 1856, Tarragona station has an uncertain future due to the arrival of the Madrid-Barcelona high-speed rail line at a new station called Camp de Tarragona, as well as the opening of an upgraded section of the Valencia−Sant Vicenç de Calders railway bypassing the city of Tarragona. Officially called a "provisional station", it is actually 10 kilometers from the centre of Tarragona, with all long-distance services being rerouted by the upgraded and high-speed lines, calling at Camp de Tarragona station instead.

References 

Railway stations in Catalonia
Rodalies de Catalunya stations
Railway stations in Spain opened in 1865